Calvin B. Fowler (February 11, 1940 – March 5, 2013) was the captain of the United States gold medal basketball team at the 1967 Pan American Games. He also was co-captain of the U.S. gold medal team at the 1968 Summer Olympics. Born near Pittsburgh, he graduated from David B. Oliver High School in Pittsburgh in June 1957 and Saint Francis University in Loretto, Pennsylvania, in 1962.  Calvin Fowler at David B. Oliver High School scored 61 points in a 101–35 win over Allegheny Vocational.  Oliver only led 27–20 at the half on Fowler's 22 points, but Fowler poured in 39 in the final two quarters (January 1958).

In the early 1960s, Fowler was a member of the Akron Wingfoots. Fowler was an Amateur Athletic Union (AAU) All-America in 1967 and again in 1968 for Akron Goodyear Wingfoots. He would later play in the American Basketball Association for the Carolina Cougars in the 1969–70 season. He played 18 times for the United States.

He is buried in the Eastern Shore Veterans Cemetery in Hurlock, Maryland.

References

External links
usabasketball.com
Calvin Fowler's obituary

1940 births
2013 deaths
African-American basketball players
Amateur Athletic Union men's basketball players
American men's basketball players
Basketball players at the 1967 Pan American Games
Basketball players at the 1968 Summer Olympics
Basketball players from Pittsburgh
Carolina Cougars players
Medalists at the 1968 Summer Olympics
Olympic gold medalists for the United States in basketball
Pan American Games gold medalists for the United States
Pan American Games medalists in basketball
Saint Francis Red Flash men's basketball players
Shooting guards
Medalists at the 1967 Pan American Games
20th-century African-American sportspeople
21st-century African-American people